Qingshui Cliff is a 21 kilometer length of coastal cliffs averaging 800 meters above sea level in Xiulin Township, Hualien County, Taiwan. The tallest peak, Qingshui Mountain, rises 2408 meters directly from the Pacific Ocean. The cliff is located at the southern part of the Suhua Highway that connects the counties of Yilan and Hualien in eastern Taiwan. It is considered to be a very scenic area  and is the highest coastal cliff in Taiwan. It is located within Taroko National Park.

Geology
The formation of the Qingshui Cliff was caused by the orogenic movement, with the Philippine Plate and the Eurasian Plate forming a fault line. The outcropping above sea level is composed of metamorphosed limestone marble, gneiss, and green schist, and is classified as a metamorphic complex area of Dananao on the geological map. Because there are very few coastal cliffs in the world that exhibit such a great elevation drop, the natural landscape of "high cliff valley" makes Qingshui cliff a rare coastal cliff. The coast of the Qingshui Cliff is continually beaten and eroded by the sea water of the Pacific Ocean, and the rock walls on it are subject to natural forces such as earthquakes and typhoons. The beaches below are full of different sizes of marble stones, from giant boulders to grains of sand.

Political disputes
The depiction of Qingshui Cliff is featured in the newly issued passport of the People's Republic of China in 2012, a move that triggered protest from Taipei to Beijing.

Biogeographic significance
Qingshui Cliff can act as a dispersal barrier. It separates the eastern and western clades of brown tree frog (Buergeria robusta) as well as two sibling species of Takydromus lizards, T. viridipunctatus and T. luyeanus. In the latter case, the separation occurs over a single river, the Liwu River.

Transportation
Qingshui Cliff is accessible southwest from Heren Station of the Taiwan Railways.

On April 2, 2021, a Taroko Express train derailed at the entrance of Daqingshui Tunnel near the cliffs after it collided with a truck that rolled down onto the tracks, killing at least 51.

Gallery

See also
 List of tourist attractions in Taiwan
 Geology of Taiwan
 Taroko National Park
 National parks of Taiwan

References

Landforms of Hualien County
Cliffs of Asia